Yu Shiotani (born 27 October 2001) is a Japanese Greco-Roman wrestler. He won one of the bronze medals in the 55 kg event at the 2022 World Wrestling Championships held in Belgrade, Serbia.

He won the gold medal in the 55 kg event at the 2021 Asian Wrestling Championships held in Almaty, Kazakhstan. He also won the gold medal in his event at the 2022 Asian Wrestling Championships held in Ulaanbaatar, Mongolia.

Achievements

References

External links 
 

Living people
2001 births
Sportspeople from Tokyo
Japanese male sport wrestlers
Asian Wrestling Championships medalists
World Wrestling Championships medalists
21st-century Japanese people